Jarryd Blair (born 14 April 1990) is a former Australian rules footballer who played for the Collingwood Football Club in the Australian Football League (AFL). Standing at only 174 centimetres, he is a small, pacy wingman/half forward flanker who made his AFL debut in round 14, 2010 against West Coast at Etihad Stadium.

Blair was impressive in his debut. He had 16 disposals (7 kicks and 9 handballs), took 2 marks and had 5 tackles in an 83-point win for Collingwood. The week after against Port Adelaide he continued to impress by kicking 2 goals. In round 20 against Essendon, he was one of the best players in Collingwood's 98 point win.  His 27 disposals and 2 goals was rewarded with one vote in the Brownlow Medal.

Blair played in the drawn 2010 AFL Grand Final and was a member of Collingwood's Premiership side a week later in the replay. At 20 years of age Blair was the second-youngest member of Collingwood's 2010 Premiership team after 19-year-old Steele Sidebottom.

In round 3 of 2011, Blair kicked a career-high 5 goals against Carlton. In round 20 that year he kicked four goals against Port Adelaide.

He is the nephew of Morningside premiership coach and former VFL player John Blair.  Blair's grandfather John O'Mahony played for Hawthorn between 1951 and 1960.

On 30 October 2018, Blair was delisted by Collingwood.

2019 Jarryd Blair is playing for Port Melbourne in the VFL

Statistics
 Statistics are correct to the end of the 2018 season

|- style="background:#eaeaea;"
! scope="row" style="text-align:center" | 2010
|style="text-align:center;"|
| 47 || 12 || 7 || 8 || 84 || 93 || 177 || 31 || 52 || 0.6 || 0.7 || 7.0 || 7.8 || 14.8 || 2.6 || 4.3
|- 
! scope="row" style="text-align:center" | 2011
|style="text-align:center;"|
| 11 || 24 || 26 || 18 || 187 || 189 || 376 || 56 || 94 || 1.1 || 0.8 || 7.8 || 7.9 || 15.7 || 2.3 || 3.9
|- style="background:#eaeaea;"
! scope="row" style="text-align:center" | 2012
|style="text-align:center;"|
| 11 || 23 || 17 || 12 || 200 || 255 || 455 || 59 || 107 || 0.7 || 0.5 || 8.7 || 11.1 || 19.8 || 2.6 || 4.7
|- 
! scope="row" style="text-align:center" | 2013
|style="text-align:center;"|
| 11 || 22 || 14 || 6 || 156 || 202 || 358 || 58 || 126 || 0.6 || 0.3 || 7.1 || 9.2 || 16.3 || 2.6 || 5.7
|- style="background:#eaeaea;"
! scope="row" style="text-align:center" | 2014
|style="text-align:center;"|
| 11 || 21 || 12 || 11 || 139 || 184 || 323 || 60 || 112 || 0.6 || 0.5 || 6.6 || 8.8 || 15.4 || 2.9 || 5.3
|- 
! scope="row" style="text-align:center" | 2015
|style="text-align:center;"|
| 11 || 20 || 19 || 9 || 140 || 170 || 310 || 57 || 83 || 1.0 || 0.5 || 7.0 || 8.5 || 15.5 || 2.9 || 4.1
|- style="background:#eaeaea;"
! scope="row" style="text-align:center" | 2016
|style="text-align:center;"|
| 11 || 21 || 15 || 7 || 142 || 189 || 331 || 59 || 105 || 0.7 || 0.3 || 6.8 || 9.0 || 15.8 || 2.8 || 5.0
|- 
! scope="row" style="text-align:center" | 2017
|style="text-align:center;"|
| 11 || 12 || 11 || 7 || 50 || 94 || 144 || 21 || 49 || 0.9 || 0.6 || 4.2 || 7.8 || 12.0 || 1.8 || 4.1
|- style="background:#eaeaea;"
! scope="row" style="text-align:center" | 2018
|style="text-align:center;"|
| 11 || 2 || 0 || 0 || 16 || 20 || 36 || 7 || 8 || 0.0 || 0.0 || 8.0 || 10.0 || 18.0 || 3.5 || 4.0
|- class="sortbottom"
! colspan=3| Career
! 157
! 121
! 78
! 1114
! 1396
! 2510
! 408
! 736
! 0.8
! 0.5
! 7.1
! 8.9
! 16.0
! 2.6
! 4.7
|}

References

External links

 

Living people
1990 births
Australian rules footballers from Victoria (Australia)
Collingwood Football Club players
Collingwood Football Club Premiership players
Gippsland Power players
People from Wonthaggi
One-time VFL/AFL Premiership players